35xxxv (read as thirty five or Sātīfaibu) is the seventh studio album by the Japanese band One OK Rock. It was released on February 11, 2015. This is their first album recorded abroad, primarily in the US. The song "Mighty Long Fall" was the theme song of the 2014 sequel film Rurouni Kenshin: Kyoto Inferno, while "Heartache" was used for the third film, Rurouni Kenshin: The Legend Ends. "Mighty Long Fall" peaked at #2 on the Billboard Japan Hot 100 and stayed for 17 weeks.

The limited version of pre-order album bundled with a DVD of the acoustic performance of the band for the songs "Mighty Long Fall" and "Decision" sold out immediately before the end of 2014.

On February 28, 2015, the album peaked at #11 on Billboard Heatseekers Albums. This chart is for new and upcoming musicians, which is usually a stepping stone towards Billboard 200 or Billboard Hot 100. On the same week, it peaked at #43 on Billboard Independent Albums. Then it peaked at #23 on the Billboard Hard Rock Albums Chart and reached #1 on the Billboard World Albums Chart.

An international version of the album was released in the United States on Warner Bros. Records on September 25, 2015 with two U.S. exclusive bonus tracks.

Background and development 
The band started recording the album in January 2014 in Los Angeles, US. They did it during their premiere tour in Los Angeles and New York. They worked with John Feldmann and Chris Lord-Alge.
On January 12, 2014 their album producer John Feldmann tweeted that One Ok Rock had already started recording their new album. The album's title, "35xxxv", came from number "35" which was considered as the band's lucky number as they kept seeing the number during their recording process in the United States.

Their first single from the forthcoming album, "Mighty Long Fall", is the theme song for the movie sequel of Rurouni Kenshin. One Ok Rock released new single "Mighty Long Fall/Decision" on July 30, 2014. The song "Decision" is the theme song for their documentary film "Fool cool rock". A music video for "Decision" released on August 20, 2014 contains a compilation footage from their last tour in Europe and Asia. They also revealed the theme song for another movie sequel of Rurouni Kenshin entitled "Heartache".

In September 2014, One Ok Rock held a 2-day stadium concert in Yokohama Stadium in front of 60,000 people called "Mighty Long Fall Live at Yokohama Stadium 2014". This was their first time performing in a stadium. Their act was broadcast live on WOWOW. They played more than twenty songs, including three new songs and a cover of "A Thousand Miles" by Vanessa Carlton.

Promotion 
One Ok Rock released the music video of "Mighty Long Fall" on June 22, 2014. On August 19, 2014 they released a compilation of footage from Who are you?? Who are we?? tour and mixed with the song "Decision". Despite of featured on the movie Rurouni Kenshin: The Legend Ends that released in September 2014, the song "Heartache" isn't officially released until the album release.
On January 14, 2015, the album could be pre-ordered on iTunes, with the song "Cry Out". On January 20, 2015, they released the music video of "Cry Out".

Track listing

Notes 
  denotes an additional producer
  "Fight the Night" ends at 4:16; followed by 6:09 of silence, followed by hidden track "Gerogeropā"

Charts

Weekly charts

Year-end charts

Singles

Other charted songs

Certifications

35xxxv (deluxe edition) 

In July 2015, One Ok Rock officially announced that they signed with Warner Bros. Records and planned to re-release 35xxxv as a deluxe edition containing all English tracks on September 25, 2015. This edition contains a black album art cover and includes two new tracks, "Last Dance" and "The Way Back". In order to promote their U.S. debut, the band had a North American tour in fall 2015 with a few selected cities as headlining artists, but also opened for All Time Low and Sleeping with Sirens for several cities in the U.S. One Ok Rock will also have world tour in Europe and Asia.

On the week of October 17, 2015, 35xxxv (Deluxe Edition) debuted at #20 on Billboard Heatseekers Albums and its highest peak position is at #17.

Track listing

Notes 
  denotes an additional producer

Charts

Singles

Personnel
Credits adapted from the liner notes of 35xxxv (deluxe edition).

One Ok Rock
 Takahiro "Taka" Moriuchi — lead vocals
 Toru Yamashita — guitar
 Ryota Kohama — bass guitar
 Tomoya Kanki — drums

General team
 Amuse Group USA, Inc. — publishing 
 Jamil Kazmi — direction, coordination, narration (4)
 Kazunori Ito — direction, coordination

Production 

 Naoki Itai — recording, programming (1)
 Justin Smith — mastering (1–15)
 Colin Brittain — mixing, additional production (1), production, engineering (2, 3), additional production (4), engineering, additional programming (5, 8), engineering, editing, programming (9, 12), production, engineering, mixing (10), additional production, engineering, editing, programming (15)
 Kato Khandwala — mixing (2, 3)
 Jordan Schmidt — engineering (2, 3), production, engineering (7), engineering (10)
 David Davis — engineering (2, 3, 10)
 Jonny Litten — programming (2, 3, 10)
 Sean Madhill — assistant engineering (2, 3, 10)
 Sonny Brooks — assistant engineering (2, 3, 10)
 Akkin — production (4)
 John Feldmann — mixing (4), production (5, 8), production, recording, mixing (9), production, recording, mixing (11), production, recording (12), production, recording, mixing (15)
 Zakk Cervini — mixing, additional production (4), engineering, additional programming (5, 8), mixing, engineering, editing, programming (9), engineering, editing, programming (11, 12), additional production, engineering, editing, programming, mixing (15)
 Tommy English — engineering (4), engineering, editing, programming (11, 12)
 Vic Wainstein — assistant engineering (4, 7)
 Chris Lord-Alge — mixing (5, 6, 8, 13, 14) 
 Tom Lord-Alge — mixing (7, 12)
 Arnold Lanni — production, engineering (6), sound designer, string arrangement (6)
 Greg Johnson — assistant engineering, sound designer, string arrangement (6)
 Todd McKernan — assistant engineering (6)
 Matt Pauling — engineering, editing, programming (9), additional engineering (15)
 Allie Snow — intern (9, 11, 12)
 Terence Healy — intern (9, 11, 12)
 Jude Cole — production, piano, synthesizer (13), production, piano, synthesizer, additional vocals (14)
 Florian Ammon — recording (13, 14) 
 Devon Corey — additional editing (15)

Additional musicians
 Fall of Ai Chamber Orchestra — strings (6)

Design
 Kazuaki Seki — art direction
 Daichi Shiono — design
 Alex Tenta — package layout

Release history

See also
 List of Oricon number-one albums of 2015

References

External links
 

2015 albums
One Ok Rock albums
Albums produced by John Feldmann
Albums produced by Colin Brittain
Alternative rock albums by Japanese artists